Nenad Cvetković (born 3 January 1996) is a Serbian footballer, playing for Sloboda Užice.

Club career
Born in Užice, Cvetković passed youth categories of the local club Sloboda. In summer 2014, he moved on loan to Čukarički, where he stayed until the end of 2014–15 season in Serbian youth league. After he overgrown U19 level, Cvetković returned to his home club where he stayed until the end of 2015. Later, Cvetković spent the whole 2016 playing with Zlatibor Čajetina in the Drina Zone League and Serbian League West. At the beginning of 2017, Cvetković returned to Sloboda. He made his debut for the club in 18 fixture match of the 2016–17 Serbian First League season, against Zemun.

Career statistics

Club

Honours
Zlatibor Čajetina
Drina Zone League: 2015–16

Personal life
Nenad is a twin brother of defender Nemanja Cvetković. He is also referred as Nenad R. Cvetković sometimes, to make a difference for other player with the same name, Nenad N. Cvetković, three days younger footballer, also born in Užice.

References

External links
 

1996 births
Living people
Sportspeople from Užice
Association football midfielders
Serbian footballers
FK Sloboda Užice players
FK Zlatibor Čajetina players
Serbian First League players